Somalia participated at the 2018 Summer Youth Olympics in Buenos Aires, Argentina from 6 October to 18 October 2018.

Competitors

Athletics

Somalia qualified 2 athletes.

References

2018 in Somalian sport
Nations at the 2018 Summer Youth Olympics
Somalia at the Youth Olympics